= The Sydney Times =

Australian newspaper

Front page of first issue of The Sydney Times, 15 August 1834

The Sydney Times was a newspaper published in Sydney, New South Wales, Australia.

== History ==
The first four-page issue was published by Nathaniel Lipscomb Kentish on 15 August 1834. It was published on Tuesday and Friday mornings. The paper closed in 1838 due to debt and Kentish resumed his career as a surveyor.

== Digitisation ==
The newspaper has been digitised from 15 August 1834 to 2 July 1838 and is available on Trove.

== See also ==
- List of newspapers in Australia
